Don Carter State Park is a state park located in Hall County, Georgia, along the shores of Lake Lanier. It is the only state park along the shores of Lake Lanier. The park offers camping, hiking, and access to the adjacent lake, among other amenities. It was officially opened to the public in 2013. As of 2022, it is Georgia's newest state park.

History

In 1994, the Georgia Department of Natural Resources began the process of land acquisition that would eventually lead to the creation of the park. In 2009, Governor Sonny Perdue signed a budget including $14 million for the construction of the park. Construction officially began in November 2011. The park opened to the public on July 15, 2013. The park is named for Don Carter, a local businessman who served on the Georgia Department of Natural Resources board for 29 years.

Area

Don Carter State Park is the only state park on the shores of Lake Lanier. It is located on the north side of the reservoir.

Facilities and Activities

As of 2022, the park offers the following facilities and activities for visitors.

 Boat Ramps
 Cottages
 Campsites
 Docks
 Equestrian trails (14.5 miles)
 Hiking trails (14.5 miles)
 Paddling trails (6 miles)

References

State parks of Georgia (U.S. state)
State parks of the Appalachians
Protected areas of Hall County, Georgia
1993 establishments in Georgia (U.S. state)